Eulimella zornikulla is a species of sea snail, a marine gastropod mollusk in the family Pyramidellidae, the pyrams and their allies.

Description
The size of the shell varies between 2 mm and 4.4 mm.

Distribution
This species occurs in the Atlantic Ocean off Mauritania at depths between 19 m and 75 m.

References

External links
 To World Register of Marine Species

zornikulla
Invertebrates of West Africa
Molluscs of the Atlantic Ocean
Gastropods described in 1994